Hard Work is an album by American jazz saxophonist John Handy which was recorded in 1976 and originally released on the ABC/Impulse label.

Reception

The album reached #4 on the Billboard jazz chart and #43 on the Billboard Top 200. Allmusic awarded the album 4 stars stating ""Hard Work" became a surprise hit, and overall, the set is open to the influence of R&B, although there are some strong moments from Handy on both alto and tenor". A single, Hard work, did reach the bubbling under positions of the UK Top 50 in September 1976.

Track listing
All compositions by John Handy
 "Hard Work" - 6:56
 "Blues for Louis Jordan" - 5:43
 "Young Enough to Dream" - 7:10
 "Love for Brother Jack" - 3:48
 "Didn't I Tell You" - 4:35
 "Afro Wiggle" - 4:44
 "You Don't Know" - 3:18

Personnel 
John Handy - alto saxophone, tenor saxophone, vocals
Hotep Cecil Barnard - keyboards
Mike Hoffmann - guitar
Chuck Rainey - electric bass
Zakir Hussain - tabla (tracks 3, 4 & 6)
James Gadson - drums
Eddie "Bongo" Brown - congas, percussion

References 

1976 albums
John Handy albums
Impulse! Records albums
Albums produced by Esmond Edwards